Ivana Mládková, née Kmeťová (born 30 January 1985 in Bojnice) is a Slovak sprint canoer who has competed since the late 2000s.

She won three medals in the K2-200m event at the ICF Canoe Sprint World Championships with a silver in 2007 and two bronzes (2009, 2010). She also won six medals at the Canoe Sprint European Championships in that event with a gold in 2008, four silvers (2005, 2007, 2009, 2010) and bronze in 2009.

Mládková was eliminated in the semifinals of the K-2 500 m event at the 2008 Summer Olympics in Beijing. Kmeťová ranked 13th in the K-2 500 m and in the K-1 200 m event (with Martina Kohlová) at the 2012 Summer Olympics in London.

References
Canoe09.ca profile 

1985 births
Canoeists at the 2008 Summer Olympics
Canoeists at the 2012 Summer Olympics
Living people
Olympic canoeists of Slovakia
Slovak female canoeists
ICF Canoe Sprint World Championships medalists in kayak
Sportspeople from Bojnice
European Games competitors for Slovakia
Canoeists at the 2015 European Games
Canoeists at the 2019 European Games